J. R. Gray (July 17, 1938 – May 11, 2022) was an American politician in the state of Kentucky. He served in the Kentucky House of Representatives as a Democrat from 1976 to 1989 and from 1995 to 2007.  He was appointed Secretary of the Kentucky Labor Cabinet in 2008, by Gov. Steve Beshear and served until his retirement in 2011.

J.R. completed his journeyman apprenticeship at Youngtown Sheet & Tube, in Gary, Indiana. He was employed at the Calvert City B.F. Goodrich. After a few years working at B.F. Goodrich, where he served as a steward & as the Directing Business Agent of the Machinist & Aerospace Workers “IAM,” District Lodge 154 Calvert City for twenty-years.

Gray and his wife Yvonne made their home in Benton from 1963 until the time of his death.  They had two children, Randy and Teresa.

References

1938 births
Living people
Democratic Party members of the Kentucky House of Representatives
People from Lyon County, Kentucky